Ceratophyllum muricatum, commonly known as the prickly hornwort, is a species of Ceratophyllum native to much of Europe, Asia, Africa, and the Americas.  

In the US it has been observed specifically in the states of Florida, Georgia and North Carolina.  It has also been observed in Cuba and Jamaica. This species is only able to thrive in inland areas, however, due to being a low-salinity tolerant species. It is rarely observed in coastal tropical areas for these reasons.

References

muricatum
Freshwater plants
Flora of Europe
Flora of Asia
Flora of Africa